Aspilapteryx inquinata is a moth of the family Gracillariidae. It is known from Turkey, Lebanon, Italy and the North Aegean Islands.

The wingspan is 8–10 mm.

The larvae probably mine the leaves of their host plant.

References

Aspilapteryx
Moths of Europe
Moths of the Middle East
Moths of Asia
Moths described in 1985